George Gill may refer to:

Sports
George Gill (cricketer) (1876–1937), English player for Somerset, Leicestershire and London
George Gill (Australian footballer) (1892–1967), Australian rules footballer
George Gill (English footballer) (1894–?), English footballer
George Gill (pitcher) (1909–1999), American baseball player
George Gill (first baseman), American Negro leagues baseball player

Others
George M. Gill (1803–1887), American attorney, businessman, and politician
George Reynolds Gill (1828–1904), English portrait painter
George Brockwell Gill (1857–1954), architect in Queensland, Australia
George W. Gill, American anthropologist

See also
George Gill Green (1842–1925), American entrepreneur and soldier